Brian MacLaren (born 21 December 1943) is a Canadian sprinter. He competed in the men's 400 metres at the 1972 Summer Olympics. He finished second in the 1967 Pan American Games 4 × 400 metres relay (with Bill Crothers, Ross MacKenzie, and Robert McLaren) and third in the 1967 Pan American Games 800 metres. He won a silver medal in the 1966 British Empire and Commonwealth Games 4 x 440 yards relay with Don Domansky, Ross MacKenzie and Bill Crothers.

In 1989, MacLaren was inducted into the Manitoba Sports Hall of Fame.

References

External links
 

1943 births
Living people
Athletes (track and field) at the 1968 Summer Olympics
Athletes (track and field) at the 1972 Summer Olympics
Canadian male sprinters
Olympic track and field athletes of Canada
Athletes (track and field) at the 1967 Pan American Games
Pan American Games medalists in athletics (track and field)
Pan American Games bronze medalists for Canada
Pan American Games silver medalists for Canada
Athletes (track and field) at the 1966 British Empire and Commonwealth Games
Commonwealth Games medallists in athletics
Commonwealth Games silver medallists for Canada
Athletes from Winnipeg
Manitoba Sports Hall of Fame inductees
Medalists at the 1967 Pan American Games
Medallists at the 1966 British Empire and Commonwealth Games